Club Atlético Estudiantes, usually called Estudiantes de Caseros or Estudiantes de Buenos Aires, is an Argentine football club from Caseros, Buenos Aires. The club is mostly known for its football team, which  currently plays in the Primera B Nacional, the second division of the Argentine football league system.

Apart from football, the club hosts other disciplines such as handball, karate, roller skating and taekwondo.

History

The beginning
By 1897 football in Argentina was practised almost exclusively by English people that lived in Buenos Aires. Three of those immigrants, called Hansen, McHardy and Fitz Simons, encouraged a group of Argentine young people to join them in order to form a team. The club was officially founded on August 15, 1898, and the name was taken from the High School they attended: Colegion Nacional Sur.

The young native players soon learned from the English men, who taught them the basics of playing football. By 1899 the name had been changed to Estudiantes, which was easier to pronounce by team's followers from the standgrounds.

First achievements

In 1904 Estudiantes promoted to Primera División. By then, the club had built a stadium, placed in Palermo, Buenos Aires where it played its home games. During the amateur years Estudiantes won its first title, the Copa de Competencia Jockey Club in 1910, defeating Gimnasia y Esgrima de Buenos Aires by 3–1 at the final.

The team also reached three Copa de Honor Municipalidad de Buenos Aires finals in 1906, 1909 and 1913 but could not won the trophy. The recognition earned during those years encouraged the managers to put the team on tours over other provinces of Argentina. These tours would also help to spread the playing of football in the rest of Argentina, increasing the popularity of this sport amongst its population. The first tour was in 1907 where Estudiantes played some matches against local teams. One of them was on May 5, 1907, when Estudiantes defeated Newell's Old Boys by 3–2. That was the first team the Rosarino team faced a squad from Buenos Aires.

Nevertheless, the most important tour took part in Brazil in 1910. Never before an Argentine football team had played outside the Río de la Plata. Estudiantes played four matches in Brazil, winning all of them. The squad scored 24 goals and conceded 3. Back in Buenos Aires, the players were received and acclaimed by a crowd and were also invited to numerous receptions due to their great performance.

Primera División

In 1928 Estudiantes merged with Sportivo Devoto, which allowed the club to incorporate some players from that club who would become notable playing for Estudiantes. Some of them were wing Nardini, forward Luis Sánchez and midfielders Horacio Méndez and Antonio Martínez. Those players, along with Estudiantes' former players such as Muschetti, Closas and Camilo Méndez formed a team that played  memorable matches against Boca Juniors and River Plate. Nevertheless, the difference between called "small" teams and the "big" ones (because of being less popular than Boca, River or Independiente) was considerable. That was more visible when the Professional era began in 1931 in Argentina with the creation of Liga Argentina. Estudiantes remained in the amateur league (which had been left by the called "big ones"), which soon lost interest so fans choose the professional championship, where their teams had moved to. Moreover, most of Estudiantes' notable players were seduced by good offers from other clubs and soon left the team. Some of the footballers that left Estudiantes were Nardini and Martínez (transferred to Boca), "Huesito" Sánchez (to Platense), Closas (to San Lorenzo de Almagro) and Camilo Méndez (acquired by River Plate).

Losing territory
Once the fusion the between Professional League and Amateur League was done, Estudiantes started its run at the second division. In 1940 the club was sent down to the third division (now Primera C Metropolitana) after finishing in the penultimate position of the tournament. Two years after, the club obtained the championship coming back to Primera B, after defeating Liniers in the finals. The usual line-up was: Mares; Garza, Monza; Menéndez, Conti, Civera; Acosta, Borjas, Gastaldo, Jara, Purgia.

Some highlights for Estudiantes were the great campaign of 1947, with Juan Calicchio being the top scorer with 36 goals in 40 matches played. Banfield's notable forward Gustavo Albella was the second top-scorer with 35 goals. In 1959 Estudiantes was relegated to the fourth division (Primera D) after finishing in the last place. In May, 1963 the club inaugurated its stadium in Caseros, Greater Buenos Aires, in a match against Sacachispas. That same year Estudiantes was relegated to Primera C after a restructuring on the Argentine league system. This lasted to 1966 when Estudiantes won another title, promoting to Primera B again.

Back to First Division

In 1974 Estudiantes made a great season reaching the championship final. The decisive match was against Unión de Santa Fe and Estudiantes lost 1–0 and could not promote to Primera División. The line-up was: Landaburu; Cillis, Gomissi, Olivera, Batain; Toublanc, Juan Carlos Bravo, Osvaldo Pérez; Roberto Osvaldo Díaz, Toloza (then Cassano), Nogneira (then Anilo).

That final loss affected players' performances and the following seasons Estudiantes did not make great campaigns. This was until 1977, when Estudiantes won the championship returning to Primera División, where the club had not played since the 1930s. Estudiantes played a total of 36 matches winning 17 with 14 draws and 5 defeats. The line-up for the last match vs. Villa Dálmine was: Balbiano; Manuel Pérez, Bravo, Paz, Gerez; Ciccarello, Alberto Pafundi, Carlos Guillermo; Toloza (then Baldovino), Ugarte, Juan Guillermo. Other players that also contributed to the victory were Filipetti, Martinuccio, Carrizo, Cortés, Méndez and Barranco. Ricardo Trigilli was designed as the coach.

During the 1978 season in Primera, one of the most important matches Estudiantes played was against Boca Juniors. The game ended up in a 1–1 tie, which allowed Quilmes a great chance to obtain the championship (which the "Cervecero" finally took advantage of). But at the end of the season, Estudiantes went down again and didn't come back to Primera yet.

Institutional development
Back in the Primera B, Estudiantes (still being coached by Trigilli) built two new standgrounds to increase the stadium capacity. Trigilli left in 1982, which the team developed a poor performance, almost being relegated to Primera C. Trigilli came back in 1983 and Estudiantes qualified to the "octagonal" searching for a place in Primera. The team finally was eliminated by Deportivo Italiano.

In 1986, Argentine football was restructured again, and therefore the Primera B Nacional was created as the second division. Estudiantes could not qualify to be in that tournament (finished 10th and only 8 were able to play in Nacional B) so the squad went on Primera B, renamed "Primera B Metropolitana" although it was a third division of the football league system.

In 1988 the club inaugurated a new grandstand which a capacity of 10,000 seats.

Promotions and relegations
After poor performances in past seasons, Estudiantes brought Ricardo Trigilli back as its coach. Under his command, the team could keep its place in the third division. In 1995–96 season Estudiantes achieved the so long awaited promotion to Nacional B, defeating its historical rival Almagro with a memorable 5–1 in the second final match (after finishing 2–2 the first game). Trigilli achieved the record of being the team's coach in the two promotions obtained by the club, 1977 and 1995–96.

In the 1998–99 season Estudiantes was relegated to Primera B Metropolitana again, along with Atlanta. Only a year lasted until team's return to Primera B Nacional, which happened in the playoffs finals defeating Sarmiento de Junín. In 2000–01 season Estudiantes went down to Primera B Metropolitana again, where it has remained since.

Club facilities
The club was founded in Buenos Aires, in the corner of Blandengues Avenue (today Avenida del Libertador) and Oro street. In 1920 it moved to Figueroa Alcorta and Dorrego Avenues and then in 1931 moved again to Villa Devoto, where it was established in Desaguadero and José P. Varela streets. The main facility still remains on that place. In 1963 Estudiantes opened its own stadium in Caseros, Buenos Aires.

Badge evolution

Current squad

Out on loan

Honours
Copa de Competencia Jockey Club (1): 1910
Segunda División (3): 1906, 1977, 1999–00
Primera C (4): 1903, 1904, 1942, 1966

Notes

References

External links

 
Association football clubs established in 1898
Football clubs in Buenos Aires Province
1898 establishments in Argentina